Laundry Blues may refer to:
 Laundry Blues (Open All Hours), an episode of Open All Hours
 Laundry Blues (film), a 1930 animated short film

See also
 Chinese Laundry Blues, a 1932 comic song associated with George Formby